Julio César García Jiménez (born July 17, 1989) is a Mexican footballer who most recently played for San Antonio Scorpions.

Club career
García played for Oro and signed with North American Soccer League side San Antonio Scorpions in 2014 after spending time with the reserve side of Chivas USA. In December 2015, San Antonio ceased operations.

References

External links
 

1989 births
Living people
Association football midfielders
Mexican footballers
CD Oro footballers
San Antonio Scorpions players
North American Soccer League players
Mexican expatriate footballers
Expatriate soccer players in the United States
Mexican expatriate sportspeople in the United States